Craig Ross Kressler (born June 23, 1961) is a retired American speed skater. At the 1979 World Junior Championships he won the 500 and 3000 m distances and finished third all-around. He competed in four speed skating events at the 1980 Winter Olympics with the best achievement of 11th place in the 500 m. Two weeks later he won a silver all-around medal at the World Junior Championships and retired from competitions. 

Personal bests: 
500 m – 38.72 (1980)
 1000 m – 1:16.45 (1980)
 1500 m – 1:58.34 (1980)
 5000 m – 7:15.90 (1980)
 10000 m – 15:49.11 (1980)

References

External links 
 

1961 births
Living people
American male speed skaters
Olympic speed skaters of the United States
Speed skaters at the 1980 Winter Olympics